The House of 1,000 Dolls is a 1967 Harry Alan Towers German-Spanish international co-production white slavery thriller starring Vincent Price. It has been described as "quite possibly the sleaziest movie AIP ever made". The film is set in Tangier. Released initially in Spain under the Spanish title La casa de las mil muñecas, it was not released in the United States until November 1967.

Plot
Stephen Armstrong (George Nader), vacationing with his wife Marie in Tangiers, runs into an old friend and learns he is searching for his missing girlfriend who was kidnapped by an international gang of white slavers.

The kidnappers are nightclub magician Manderville (Vincent Price) and his mentalist partner Rebecca (Martha Hyer). Under the guise of their nightclub act, they hypnotize and kidnap young women for the white slavers, and spirit them away to an exclusive brothel called "The House of 1000 Dolls." Stephen continues the investigation when his friend is murdered.

Cast
Vincent Price as Felix Manderville
Martha Hyer as Rebecca
George Nader as Stephen Armstrong
Ann Smyrner as Marie Armstrong
Wolfgang Kieling as Inspector Emil
Sancho Gracia as Fernando
Maria Rohm as Diane
Luis Rivera as Paul
José Jaspe as Ahmed
Juan Olaguivel as Salim
Herbert Fux as Abdu
Yelena Samarina as Madame Viera
Diane Bond as Liza
Andrea Lascelles as Doll
Ursula Janis as Doll

Production
The film originated with Harry Alan Towers, who shot the movie in Madrid and got Samuel Arkoff at AIP to contribute financing.

At one stage Terence Fisher was announced as director. Vic Damone was mentioned as going to support Vincent Price and Martha Hyer, but he ended up being replaced by George Nader.

Filming began in November 1966. Knowing that local censors would prohibit filming, Towers gave them a copy of Abe Lincoln in Illinois and hired an actor to walk around the set dressed like Abraham Lincoln in case the censors dropped by.

According to Price in a 1984 interview, he had been signed on to the project without full knowledge of what the film would be about. After his scenes were shot, "Martha Hyer and I were led off ... so we went to visit on the set and we found that they were remaking all of the scenes we'd been in, but a pornographic version of it." He added, "I never got to see it."

Reception
The Chicago Tribune called the film "not even bad enough to be good... [a] bargain basement backfire that is strictly discount Price."

The New York Times described the film as containing "routine sleuthing, double-crossing and chasing."

See also
List of American films of 1967

References

External links

1967 films
1967 crime drama films
American crime drama films
1967 horror films
American International Pictures films
American horror drama films
British thriller drama films
Italian thriller drama films
Spanish thriller drama films
West German films
1960s English-language films
English-language German films
English-language Italian films
English-language Spanish films
Films directed by Jeremy Summers
Films about magic and magicians
Films about prostitution
Films set in Tangier
American sexploitation films
1960s American films
1960s British films
1960s Italian films